is a Japanese jazz trumpeter and arranger.

Kuroda came to music by joining his school's big band. Later he frequently visited jam sessions in Kobe. In 2003 he moved to the United States and was a course participant at Berklee College of Music before settling in Brooklyn, New York City. At the less expensive College of Performing Arts of The New School, he studied jazz and contemporary music, earning his degree in 2006. His study colleague José James became a close friend and musical partner, in 2014 producing his studio album Rising Son.

Discography

As leader 
 Bitter and High (CD Baby, 2010)
 Edge (CD Baby, 2011)
 Six Aces (P-Vine, 2013)
 Rising Son (Blue Note, 2014)
 Zigzagger (Concord, 2016)
 Fly Moon Die Soon (First Word, 2020)
 Midnight Crisp (First Word, 2022)

As sideman
 José James, Blackmagic (Brownswood Recordings, 2010)
 José James, No Beginning No End (Blue Note, 2013)
 José James, While You Were Sleeping (Blue Note, 2014)

Other appearances
 Blue Note Voyage (Blue Note, 2019) - Compilation album with  Akihiro Nishiguchi, Jun Miyakawa, Ai Kuwabara, Ryuta Tsunoda, Tomo Kanno,

References 

1980 births
Japanese jazz trumpeters
Japanese music arrangers
Living people
21st-century trumpeters
Blue Note Records artists
Concord Records artists
P-Vine Records artists